Thomas Amory D.D. (28 January 1701 – 24 June 1774) was a British dissenting tutor and minister and poet from Taunton.

Biography
His father was a grocer and his mother a sister of Henry Grove. He was at school under Chadwick, a local dissenting minister, and learned French at Exeter under André de Majendie, a refugee minister. On 25 March 1717 he entered, as a divinity student, the Taunton Academy, then the chief seat of culture for the dissenters of the west, under Stephen James of Fullwood, who taught theology, and Henry Grove, who taught philosophy. He received his testimonials for the ministry in 1722, and then went to London to study experimental physics in the academy of John Eames in Moorfields. In 1725, on Stephen James's death and before his own ordination, he acted as assistant in the ministry to Robert Darch, at Hull Bishops, and in the Taunton Academy to Grove. He was ordained 3 October 1730 as colleague to Edmund Batson at Paul's Meeting, Taunton. Batson was more conservative in theology than Amory, and was unwilling to divide the stipend; hence, in 1732, Amory's friends seceded and built him a new meeting-house in Tancred Street. On Grove's death in 1738 Amory was placed at the head of the academy.

A list of his students is given in the Monthly Repository, 1818; there were more men of mark under Grove; Amory's best pupils were Thomas and John Wright of Bristol. In 1741 he married Mary, daughter of the Rev. S. Baker of Southwark. By her he had five children, four of whom survived him. He moved to London in October 1759 to become afternoon preacher at the Old Jewry meeting-house, and in 1766 succeeded Samuel Chandler as co-pastor of the congregation with Nathaniel White. He was elected one of Daniel Williams's trustees in 1767 (his portrait is in Dr. Williams's Library). He received the degree of D.D. Edin. in 1768, and was Tuesday lecturer at Salters' Hall from 1768, and morning preacher at Newington Green, as colleague with Dr. Richard Price, from 1770, in addition to his other duties. Though thus full of preaching engagements, he was not so popular in London as he had been in Taunton. His theology, of the Clarkean type, was not conservative enough for the bulk of the London presbyterians of that day. His style was dry and disquisitional; his manner wanting in animation. But he was a leader of the dissenting liberals, and in 1772 a strenuous supporter of the agitation for a removal of the subscription to the doctrinal articles of the established church, till 1779 demanded of all dissenting ministers by the Toleration Act. Amory, like many others, had in point of fact never subscribed, and he had to combat the opposition of his friends, who thought, with Joseph Priestley, that a subscription not rigidly enforced was better than a new declaration (that they received the Scriptures as containing a divine revelation), which might be pressed in the interests of intolerance. Amory did not live to see the bill for this new declaration pass, after being twice rejected by the Lords.

He died on 24 June 1774, and was buried in the hallowed ground of dissent at Bunhill Fields. The inscription on his tomb speaks of him as 'having been employed for more than fifty years in humbly endeavouring to discover the religion of Jesus Christ in its origin and purity.'

Works
Andrew Kippis gives a list of his twenty-seven publications, including prefaces and single sermons. His maiden effort was a 'Poem on Taunton,' 1724. He wrote the life and edited the works of Grove, 1745; prefixed a memoir of the author to Dr. George Benson's 'Life of Jesus Christ,' 1764; and edited Chandler's posthumous sermons, with memoir, 1768.

References

English Christian religious leaders
Dissenting academy tutors
People from Taunton
1701 births
1774 deaths
Burials at Bunhill Fields